Northwest Career and Technical Academy, or NWCTA, is a nine-month magnet school in Las Vegas, Nevada in the Clark County School District (CCSD). The school first opened for the 2007-2008 school year, admitting only freshman and sophomores. Each year, another grade was added to accommodate the influx of students until all four grades were implemented in the 2009-2010 school year. Currently, the school holds a five star rating with the district.

Mission statement
"The mission of the Northwest Career and Technical Academy is to boldly educate today's learners for tomorrow's challenges by developing advanced skills through unique hands-on experiences in a professional setting, utilizing community partnerships, innovative ideas, and contemporary technologies."

Program areas
NWCTA offers eight program areas:

Engineering & Design

Hospitality

Mechanical Technology

Culinary Arts

Construction Management

Teacher Education

Medical Professions

Biotechnology.

Each program area is dedicated a section of the school, including each having an assigned glass-walled "project room". The programs also have access to unique facilities, such as the TV studio for Media Communications, a garage for Mechanical Technology, a workshop for Construction Management, a kitchen for the Culinary Arts, along with a kindergarten for Early Childhood and Teacher Education students.
The new building received the international annual design award of the Council of Educational Facilities Planners International for 2008, the James D. MacConnell Award for outstanding new educational facilities.

Academics and Atmosphere

NWCTA was named a Magnet School of Distinction by the Magnet Schools of America in 2010 and 2011. The school's population is over 1900 and has a student/teacher ratio of 28/1.

Notable alumni

Tyler Dale, Co-star on The History Channel's "American Restoration"
Victory Bryant, Known as a Social Media Influence, known for his appearance on "The Morning Madness Podcast” and other serial internet productions.

References

External links
 School Website
 https://magnet.edu/
 https://www.nwctahawks.net/

Magnet schools in Nevada
Educational institutions established in 2007
High schools in Las Vegas
2007 establishments in Nevada
Public high schools in Nevada